William ffolkes may refer to:

Sir William ffolkes, 2nd Baronet (1786–1860), MP for Norfolk
William ffolkes (cricketer) (1820–1867), cricketer and son of the above
Sir William ffolkes, 3rd Baronet (1847–1912), MP for King's Lynn